Nafas is an Iranian History and Romance series. The series is directed by Jalil Saman.

Storyline 
Nahid is a student girl who meets Roozbeh, a member of the Mujahedin. In the midst of the events of the Iranian Revolution, a secret is revealed in her life… She goes through complex events to reach the truth....

Cast 
 Sanaz Saeedi
 Masoud Rayegan
 Behnaz Jafari
 Fatemeh Goudarzi
 Pejman Jamshidi
 Jaleh Sameti
 Elham Nami
 Dariush Farhang
 Alireza Kamali
 Ramin Rastad
 Soodabeh Beyzaei
 Hadi Hejazifar
 Hedayat Hashemi
 Khosro Shahraz
 Ehsan Amani
 Ghorban Najafi
 Shahab Shadabi
 Atoosa Rasti

References

External links
 

2010s Iranian television series
Iranian television series